Archelaus of Priene was a Greek sculptor who lived close to 300 BC in Priene. He is remembered for his apotheosis of Homer, a marble relief aggrandising the poet that is now preserved in the British Museum.

References 

Ancient Greek sculptors
4th-century BC people
People from Söke